Vilhelm Harry Larsson-Lagheim (23 June 1911 – 13 September 1971) was a Swedish ice hockey player. He competed in the men's tournament at the 1936 Winter Olympics.

References

1911 births
1971 deaths
Ice hockey players at the 1936 Winter Olympics
Olympic ice hockey players of Sweden
Ice hockey people from Stockholm
Swedish ice hockey players